"Something to Sing About" is a Canadian patriotic song by Oscar Brand.

Something to Sing About may also refer to:

 Something to Sing About (1937 film), a film directed by Victor Schertzinger and starring James Cagney
 Something to Sing About (2000 film), a television movie starring Darius McCrary
 Something to Sing About (album), a folk-music compilation album including songs by John Denver
 "Something to Sing About" (Buffyverse), a song from the Buffy the Vampire Slayer episode "Once More, with Feeling"